Kupang is a town in Baling District, Kedah, Malaysia.

Kupang town lies on the intersection of the Penang-Kelantan highway Federal Route 4 and Sungai Petani-Baling highway Federal Route 67

Baling District
Towns in Kedah